Out Of The Box the title of the debut mini-album released by Jade Valerie. It was released on October 17, 2007 as two versions, a CD only and a CD + DVD version, and later on, was released in Korea in a new edition. The Korean edition parted with 'Goodbye' and 'Mr. Pay Me' from the original release, with the addition of highlight tracks from Jade's following album, Bittersweet Symphony. The album saw a combination of new influences by Jade, mostly centering on modern musical trends. 'Crush', featuring guest vocalist Baek Ji-young on the Korean release, and sampled a classical piece in the style of Sweetbox, while many tracks showcased Jade Valerie experimenting with new vocal and musical styles. The album reached #27 on the Oricon Charts Weekly Albums chart.

Track listing
Japanese Version
 Tuned Up
 Just Another Day
 Show Me
 Uh Lala
 Crush
 Mr. Pay Me
 You Don't Know Me
 Goodbye

Korean Version
 Tuned Up
 Just Another Day
 Uh Lala
 You Don't Know Me
 Crush
 Show Me
 Razorman
 Like A Bird (Geo’s Mix) 
 Empty Pages
 Lucky Lady
 We Can Run
 Undone
 Stuck
 The Last
 You Don't Know Me (feat. Kim Dong Wan) (Bonus Track)

Promotional videos
 "Just Another Day" (2007)

External links
 

Jade Valerie albums
2007 albums